The District of Columbia is a political division coterminous with Washington, D.C., the capital city of the United States. According to the Article One of the Constitution, only states may be represented in the United States Congress. The District of Columbia is not a U.S. state and therefore has no voting representation in the United States Senate. However, it does have a non-voting delegate to represent it in the House.

The majority of residents want the district to become a state and gain full voting representation in Congress. To prepare for this goal, the district has elected shadow senators since 1990. The shadow senator emulates the role of representing the district in the Senate and pushes for statehood alongside the non-voting House delegate and shadow representatives. The district has held 11 shadow senator elections.

The Democratic Party has immense political strength in the district; in each of the shadow senator elections, the district has overwhelmingly voted for the Democratic candidate, with no margin less than 58 percentage points.

Shadow senator elections

Initial

Class I

Class II

Graph
The following graph shows the margin of victory of the Democratic Party over the runner-up in the 11 shadow senator elections the District of Columbia has held, excluding the initial 1990 election that had two winners.

See also
 Elections in the District of Columbia
 United States House of Representatives elections in the District of Columbia
 United States presidential elections in the District of Columbia

Notes

References

 
District of Columbia